Isabelle Ferron (born 1967) is a French actress, comedian, and dancer both in film and on stage.

Early life and education

Isabelle Ferron was born on January 27, 1967, in Poitiers, France.  When she turned seven, her mother enrolled her in the Conservatoire de Poitiers to learn the art of dancing , as well as how to play the piano. In 1987, she moved to Poitiers and trained with Niels Arestrup, then with Maurice Benichou in 1988. Then from 1992 to 1997 she trained with John Strasberg.

Career 
Isabelle then entered the theater stage in 1986 with her first performance in Six Assassins Assassinés followed by Un Enfant Mort sur le Trottoir in the same year (she was 19). After long years filled with experiences on stage, she moved to try the screen. She played the role of Didier's wife, Murielle in Didier Bourdon and Bernard Campan's Le Pari (The Bet) in 1997 and more films. From then on, she took turns from being on screen to the stage. In 1999, she was chosen to play the very energetic Lady Capulet in Gerard Presgurvic's version of Roméo et Juliette. She signed their contract without second thoughts, as she knew that she was about to interpret beautiful songs. She had once described her audition for the role, and said that she was first asked to sing a challenging, yet striking song, called La Haine (The Hate) and afterwards a song which she had found funny was called Tu dois te marier (You Must Marry).

After more than a hundred performances as Lady Capulet, Isabelle left the cast on July 21, 2001, to continue her switches from film to stage. She was replaced by Karoline Blandin. Isabelle was still included in the music videos of the two songs, Verone and Aimer. She was also chosen to appear in some TV shows such as Julie Lescaut. Her other stage performances include: "Y’a-t-il un Magicien dans la Salle"(Is there a magician in the room?) and "Un violon sur le toit", the French version of the classic Fiddler on the Roof. Her solo in the aforementioned turned out to be a single as it is probably the only song with coherent lyrics. Isabelle won an award for her role as Golde in 2007 during the Marius awards. She has several plans for her career. The first one is to write a musical with her colleague, Anna Angeli. She describes that in that certain play, she would have a scene where she is alone with the monologue and the music. If not, then Isabelle dreams to earn more roles for films, stage plays and musicals, like Roméo et Juliette. Isabelle Ferron continues to work as it is one of her strongest and deepest desires. In 2008, she was included in the Festival Diva Music (a festival of twenty different musicals). She performed in L'ultime rendez-vous and a solo lecture-musical called Chienne.

Cinema

2004 - Les Gens Honnêtes Vivent en France by Bob Decout (Sabine Charpentier)
2003 - La Confiance Regne by Etienne Chatillez (Infirmière)
1998 - Monsieur Naphtali by Olivier Schatzky (Muriel)
1997 - The Bet by Didier Bourdon & Bernard Campan (Murielle)
1996 - Golden Boy by Jean-Pierre Vergne
1995 - Pedale Douce by Gabriel Aghion (Chantal)

Television

2007 - Sa Raison d'être Renaud BERTRAND (Muriel Blondel)
2006 - Reporters Gilles BANNIER
2005 - Madame est dans l'Escalier Luc BERAUD
2005 - Julie Lescaut – Dangereuses Rencontres Daniel JANNEAU
2003 - Le Grand Patron – Effets Secondaires Claudio TONETTI
2002 - Les Grands Frères Henri HELMAN
2000 - La Maison du Pendu Patrice MARTINEAU
1992 - Drôles d'histoires Roger KAHANE

Theater
2010 - "La leçon" - Eugène Ionesco & Samuel Sené
2009 - Le siècle sera féminin ou ne sera pas ... - Dominique COUBES & Nathalie VIERNE
2008 - Happy Hanouka d'Alex Pandev et Sylvie Audecoeur - Jean-Luc MOREAU
2006 - A Fond la Caisse Théâtre La Grande Comédie - Jérôme FOUCHER
2004 - Faux Départ Théâtre Rive Gauche - Thierry HARCOURT
1994 - J'ai 20 ans - Roger LOURET
1993 - L'Ascenceur Théâtre Les Blancs Manteaux - Roland MARCHISIO
1990 - Salade de Nuit Théâtre Les Blancs Manteaux - M. LERIS
1989/90 - Le Prince Travesti Espace Acteur - G. SHELLEY
1988 - La Cantatrice Chauve - V. LABUSSIERE
1987 - La Sorcière Guichet Montparnasse - G. O’PRETRE
1987 - Le Millénaire des Capétiens La Villette - P. PREVOST
1986 - Un Enfant Mort sur le Trottoir - I. FERRON
1986 - Six Assassins Assassinés - L. BOURQUIN

Musicals
2010/11 - "Chienne" - Alexandre Bonstein
2007 - L'Ultime Rendez-Vous Péniche Opéra - Vincent VITTOZ
2005/06 - Un Violon sur le Toit Théâtre Comédia & Tournée - J. DESCHAUX & O. BENEZECH
2002 - Y'a-t-il un Magicien dans la Salle - Gérard PULLICINO
2000/01 - Roméo et Juliette - REDHA
1996/97 - Passe Muraille - Alain SACHS
1993/96 - Twist - Roger LOURET
1993 - La Java des Mémoires Théâtre de la Renaissance - Roger LOURET
1992 - Les Misérables - Théâtre MogadorLa Royal Shakespeare Cie
1988 - Sylphide - S. DORIAN

References

External links
https://web.archive.org/web/20080625090817/http://www.regardencoulisse.com/articles/article.php?num=89
https://web.archive.org/web/20080513215851/http://www.agencesartistiques.com/v2/template.cfm?id=368
http://www.myspace.com/isabelleferron
http://www.comedie2000.com/detail_personne.php3?personne=isabelle_ferron&comedie_musicale=romeo_et_juliette
https://web.archive.org/web/20080924093606/http://www.lultimerendezvous.com/
http://www.romeojulietmusicals.com/
http://www.divamusic.fr/ 
http://www.webzinemaker.com/admi/m15/page.php3?num_web=46130&rubr=3&id=365473

1967 births
Living people
Conservatoire à rayonnement régional de Poitiers alumni
French television actresses
French film actresses
French musical theatre actresses
People from Poitiers
French stage actresses